The first USS Elfin was a light draft gunboat acquired by the Union Navy during the American Civil War. She was used by the Union Navy as a patrol vessel on Confederate waterways.

She was purchased as W. C. Mann by Admiral David Dixon Porter at Cincinnati, Ohio, February 23, 1864, and placed under the command of Acting Master A. F. Thompson.

Assigned to the Mississippi Squadron 

Assigned to the Mississippi Squadron, she cruised in the 7th District between Caledonia and Mound City, Illinois, for a month, then took up duty in the 9th District extending from Cairo, Illinois, to the head of the Tennessee River.

Elfin destroyed in combat with Confederate shore batteries 

After a severe engagement of several hours with heavy Confederate shore batteries it was considered impossible to save the three vessels, and they were burned to prevent capture.

References 

Ships of the Union Navy
Gunboats of the United States Navy
Steamships of the United States Navy
Shipwrecks of the American Civil War
Shipwrecks in rivers
Maritime incidents in November 1864